Mohammed Al-Otaibi (born 11 May 1993) is a Saudi professional footballer who currently plays as a midfielder for Ohod.

Honours
Al-Wehda
MS League: 2017–18

Al-Batin
MS League: 2019–20

References

1993 births
Living people
Sportspeople from Mecca
Saudi Arabian footballers
Al-Wehda Club (Mecca) players
Al Batin FC players
Ohod Club players
Hajer FC players
Al-Shoulla FC players
Saudi First Division League players
Saudi Professional League players
Association football midfielders